In enzymology, an UDP-glucose—hexose-1-phosphate uridylyltransferase is an enzyme that catalyzes the chemical reaction

UDP-glucose + alpha-D-galactose 1-phosphate  alpha-D-glucose 1-phosphate + UDP-galactose

Thus, the two substrates of this enzyme are UDP-glucose and alpha-D-galactose 1-phosphate, whereas its two products are alpha-D-glucose 1-phosphate and UDP-galactose.

This enzyme belongs to the family of transferases, specifically those transferring phosphorus-containing nucleotide groups (nucleotidyltransferases).  The systematic name of this enzyme class is UDP-glucose:alpha-D-galactose-1-phosphate uridylyltransferase. Other names in common use include uridyl transferase, hexose-1-phosphate uridylyltransferase, uridyltransferase, and hexose 1-phosphate uridyltransferase.  This enzyme participates in galactose metabolism and nucleotide sugars metabolism.

Structural studies

References

 
 
 
 
 

EC 2.7.7
Enzymes of known structure